Bangka Regency is a regency (kabupaten) of Bangka Belitung Islands, Indonesia. It covers 2,950.68 km2 and had a population of 277,204 at the 2010 Census rising to 326,265 at the 2020 Census. The coastal town of Sungailiat is its regency seat.

Administrative Districts
The Regency is divided into eight districts (kecamatan), tabulated below with their areas and their populations at the 2010 Census and the 2020 Census. The table also includes the number of administrative villages (rural desa and urban kelurahan) and the number of offshore islands in each district, and its postal codes.

Religion
Bangka Regency has 247,316 Moslem, 31,710 Buddhism religion, 6,464 Protestantism, 5,845 Confusianism, 3,368 Catholicism, 2,326 other religions, 62 Hinduism  and 16,995 persons are not identified.

References

External links 

 

Regencies of Bangka Belitung Islands